Admiral Fouad Mohamed Abou Zikry (November 17, 1923 – January 26, 1983) was a career military man, rising in the ranks of the Egyptian military, and then the ministry of defense, ending his career where he witnessed two wars as a presidential advisor. Commander-in-Chief of the Egyptian Navy (June 1967 to September 1969 / October 1972 to November 1976) and Vice Defense Minister from 12 February 1972 to October 29, 1973.  He later served as an Advisor of Naval Affairs to the President of the Republic of Egypt (Anwar Al Sadat), Deputy Minister of Maritime Transport, Chairman of Federal Arab Maritime Company (FAMCO). He remains the only Egyptian Navy officer to have held the ranks of both Admiral and Field Marshal in the history of the Egyptian Armed Forces.

Cultural depictions
 Abu Zikry was portrayed by Egyptian actor Salah Zulfikar in the 1994 war film Road To Eilat (Al-Tareek Ela Eilat).

Gallery

References

External links
 Australian Airforce

1923 births
1983 deaths
Egyptian people of the Yom Kippur War
20th-century Egyptian military personnel
Egyptian Navy admirals